Urs Niedhart (born 11 September 1969) is a Swiss skier. He competed in the Nordic combined event at the 1992 Winter Olympics.

References

External links
 

1969 births
Living people
Swiss male Nordic combined skiers
Olympic Nordic combined skiers of Switzerland
Nordic combined skiers at the 1992 Winter Olympics
Place of birth missing (living people)